Zoe Jordan is an Irish fashion designer.

In 2013, Jordan was short listed for the British Fashion Council Vogue Fashion Fund award.

References

Year of birth missing (living people)
British fashion designers
Living people